Larkmead may refer to:
Larkmead, West Virginia, United States
Larkmead School in Abingdon, Oxfordshire, England